Josue Souza Santos, or simply Josue (born July 10, 1987), is a Brazilian striker. Since June 2012 he has played for A.D. San Carlos.

Club statistics

References

External links

1987 births
Living people
Brazilian footballers
Brazilian expatriate footballers
Anagennisi Karditsa F.C. players
Expatriate footballers in Japan
J2 League players
Sagan Tosu players
FC Machida Zelvia players
Association football midfielders